Vladimir Pascal  (born 27 May 1992, in Haiti) is a Haitian-Guadeloupean footballer who currently plays as a midfielder for CS Moulien of the Guadeloupe Division d'Honneur, the top division of the Guadeloupe football league system. He is also a member of the Guadeloupe national football team.

Club career
Pascal played for AS Dragon in his native Guadeloupe between 2008 and 2011 when they were relegated from the top flight. For the 2010/2011 season, Pascal was the league's top goal scorer, scoring 22 goals. Following this campaign, Pascal traveled to metropolitan France and had unsuccessful trials with RC Lens and LB Châteauroux, both of Ligue 2. Pascal also previously had trials with other lower-division clubs in France and Cyprus.  Pascal then played half a season for J. S. Suresnes, an amateur club in the Championnat Paris Ile-De-France of the Promotion d'Honneur, the ninth division of the French football league system, in the Paris region, scoring 11 goals.   Subsequently, after not receiving a professional contract in France, he signed for CS Moulien and returned to the Guadeloupe Division d'Honneur.

In December 2013, Pascal was one of 23 players invited to the inaugural MLS Caribbean Combine, a joint venture between Major League Soccer and the Caribbean Football Union aiming to provide exposure for the region's best players in hopes of being selected in the 2014 MLS SuperDraft, as the two entities continued to build a stronger relationship.

International career
Pascal made his debut for the Guadeloupe national football team in a friendly against St. Kitts and Nevis on 2 March 2010. He has since gone on to be part of the squad for the 2010 and 2012 Coupe de l'Outre-Mer and Guadeloupe's unsuccessful run during 2012 Caribbean Cup qualification.  He scored his first international goal on 22 September 2012 against Saint Pierre and Miquelon during the 2012 Coupe de l'Outre-Mer, a football tournament for the overseas departments and territories of France. In 2012, Pascal represented Haiti, the nation of his birth, at the Under-23 level during their unsuccessful qualifying campaign for the 2012 Summer Olympics.

International goals
Scores and results list Guadeloupe's goal tally first.

References

1992 births
Living people
Association football midfielders
Expatriate footballers in France
Guadeloupe international footballers
Haitian footballers
Guadeloupe youth international footballers
Haiti youth international footballers
People from Ouest (department)